Feliński is a surname. Notable people with the surname include:

Alojzy Feliński (1771–1820), Polish writer
Roman Feliński (1886–1953), Polish architect
Zygmunt Szczęsny Feliński (1822–1895), Archbishop of Warsaw

See also
Falinski

Polish-language surnames